The men's 1500 metres event  at the 1985 European Athletics Indoor Championships was held on 2 and 3 March.

Medalists

Results

Heats
First 3 from each heat (Q) and the next 3 fastest (q) qualified for the final.

Final

References

1500 metres at the European Athletics Indoor Championships
1500